Yaroslav Tulyakov (born 7 April 1990) is a Russian professional ice hockey player.

Tulyakov played with HC Vityaz Podolsk of the Kontinental Hockey League (KHL) during the 2012–13 season.

References

External links

1990 births
Living people
People from Podolsk
HC Vityaz players
Russian ice hockey forwards
Sportspeople from Moscow Oblast